Emmett Stone is a 1985 Australian film based on a play by Michael Gurr.

References

1985 films
Australian drama films
Australian films based on plays
1980s English-language films
1980s Australian films